William Fogg Osgood (March 10, 1864, Boston – July 22, 1943, Belmont, Massachusetts) was an American mathematician.

Education and career
In 1886, he graduated from Harvard, where, after studying at the universities of Göttingen (1887–1889) and Erlangen (Ph.D., 1890), he was instructor (1890–1893), assistant professor (1893–1903), and thenceforth professor of mathematics. From 1918 to 1922, he was chairman of the department of mathematics at Harvard. He became professor emeritus in 1933. From 1934 to 1936, he was visiting professor of mathematics at Peking University.

From 1899 to 1902, he served as editor of the Annals of Mathematics, and in 1905–1906 was president of the American Mathematical Society, whose Transactions he edited in 1909–1910.

Contributions
The works of Osgood dealt with complex analysis, in particular conformal mapping and uniformization of analytic functions, and calculus of variations. He was invited by Felix Klein to write an article on complex analysis in the Enzyklopädie der mathematischen Wissenschaften which was later expanded in the book Lehrbuch der Funktionentheorie.

Osgood curves, Jordan curves with positive area, are named after Osgood, who published a paper proving their existence in 1903.

Besides his research on analysis, Osgood was also interested in mathematical physics and wrote on the theory of the gyroscope.

Awards and honors
In 1904, he was elected to the National Academy of Sciences.

Personal
Osgood's cousin, Louise Osgood, was the mother of Bernard Koopman.

Selected publications 
Osgood's books include: 
 
 Introduction to Infinite Series (Harvard University Press 1897; third edition, 1906)
 (with W. C. Graustein) Plane and solid analytic geometry (Macmillan, NY, 1921)
 Lehrbuch der Funktionentheorie (Teubner, Berlin, 1907; second edition, 1912)
 First Course in Differential and Integral Calculus (1907; revised edition, 1909)
 Elementary calculus (MacMillan, NY, 1921)
 Mechanics (MacMillan, NY, 1937)

See also 
Riemann mapping theorem
Osgood's lemma
Osgood–Brown theorem
Moore–Osgood theorem
Stieltjes–Osgood theorem

Notes

References 
. 
. 
 J. L. Coolidge, G. D. Birkhoff & E. C. Kemble (1943) William Fogg Osgood, Science 98:399–400 (issue #2549).
 .
.
.
.

External links

1864 births
1943 deaths
19th-century American mathematicians
20th-century American mathematicians
American science writers
Harvard University faculty
Harvard University alumni
Complex analysts
Mathematical analysts
Members of the United States National Academy of Sciences
Writers from Boston
Presidents of the American Mathematical Society
Mathematicians from Massachusetts